This article lists political parties in Anguilla.

Due to holding elections under forms of first-past-the-post, Anguilla has a two-party system, which means that there are two dominant political parties, with it being extremely difficult for anybody to achieve electoral success under the banner of any other party.

The parties
Anguilla Patriotic Movement
Anguilla Progressive Party
Anguilla Strategic Alliance
Anguilla United Front, an alliance of:
Anguilla Democratic Party
Anguilla National Alliance
Anguilla United Movement
Movement for Grassroots Democracy

See also
 Politics of Anguilla
 List of political parties by country

 
Anguilla
Anguilla
Political parties